Takuidae is a family of crustaceans belonging to the order Stomatopoda.

Genera:
 Mesacturoides Manning, 1978
 Mesacturus Miers, 1880
 Taku Manning, 1995

References

Crustaceans